Wet Paint is a 1926 American comedy silent film directed by Arthur Rosson and starring Raymond Griffith, Helene Costello, Bryant Washburn, Natalie Kingston and Henry Kolker. Written by Lloyd Corrigan and Reggie Morris, the film was released on May 3, 1926, by Paramount Pictures.

The film is now lost.

Cast 
Raymond Griffith as He
Helene Costello as She
Bryant Washburn as Her Brother
Natalie Kingston as A Beautiful Woman
Henry Kolker as A Husband

References

External links 
 
 
  lantern slide

1926 films
1920s English-language films
Silent American comedy films
1926 comedy films
Paramount Pictures films
Films directed by Arthur Rosson
American black-and-white films
American silent feature films
Lost American films
1926 lost films
Lost comedy films
1920s American films